Slayer  was an American thrash metal band formed in 1981 by guitarists Kerry King and Jeff Hanneman, who recruited vocalist and bassist Tom Araya, and drummer Dave Lombardo. Slayer's first two albums, Show No Mercy (1983) and Hell Awaits (1985), which were released on Metal Blade Records, did not chart in the United States. The band was then signed to Def Jam Recordings by Rick Rubin, who produced Reign in Blood (1986). The album helped Slayer break into the Billboard 200 for the first time, peaking at number 94. After South of Heaven (1988), Slayer signed to Rubin's new label, Def American, and released Seasons in the Abyss (1990). After the album was released, Lombardo departed Slayer and was replaced by Paul Bostaph.

1994's Divine Intervention, the first album to feature Bostaph, peaked at number eight in the US, the band's best chart performance at the time. Diabolus in Musica (1998) was criticized for its nu metal traits, while God Hates Us All (2001) created controversy for its graphic artwork. Bostaph left the band due to an injury and was replaced by former member Lombardo. Christ Illusion (2006) was Slayer's most successful effort, debuting at number five in the US and winning two Grammy Awards. Slayer sold 5 million copies in the United States from 1991 to 2013, according to Nielsen SoundScan, and over 20 million worldwide. Slayer is considered one of the "big four" of thrash metal along with Anthrax, Metallica and Megadeth and has earned six gold certifications and one multi-platinum plaque from the Recording Industry Association of America (RIAA).

Albums

Studio albums

Live albums

EPs

Box sets

Singles

Other appearances

Videos

Music videos

Video albums

References

External links
 Slayer at Discogs

Heavy metal group discographies
Discography
Discographies of American artists